Lycodon ruhstrati, also known as Ruhstrat's wolf snake, the mountain wolf snake, or the Formosa wolf snake, is a species of non-venomous colubrid snake found in Taiwan, southern and eastern China, and northern Vietnam.

Taxonomy
The specific name, ruhstrati, was chosen to honor German-born Ernst Konrad A. Ruhstrat (died 1913), of the Imperial Chinese Customs Service, who collected the type specimens of this species in southern Taiwan.

Lycodon ruhstrati is a member of the genus Lycodon, a genus of snakes commonly known as wolf snakes. The genus belongs to the snake family Colubridae. Colubridae is the largest snake family, with member genera and species being found on every continent except Antarctica.

The genus Lycodon has at times been placed in the genus Oligodon, but this classification is under dispute. The species Lycodon multifasciatus was previously listed as a subspecies of L. ruhstrati, being classified as Lycodon ruhstrati multifasciatus in 1984. However, in 2008 it was classified as a separate species as Lycodon multifasciatus. The species Dinodon futsingensis, first described in 1928, was synonymised with Lycodon ruhstrati in 1929. However, in 2009 it was recognized as a separate species, and named Lycodon futsingensis. In 2013, the genetic sequence of L. ruhsrati was used as part of a study which suggested combining the genera Lycodon and Dinodon. L. ruhstrati currently has two subspecies: Lycodon ruhstrati ruhstrati , the nominate subspecies, first described from Taiwan; and Lycodon ruhstrati abditus , described from Vietnam.

Description
The color pattern of L. ruhstrati is highly variable, although it tends to be dark-colored with several light-colored crossbands on its back.

Habitat and ecology
L. ruhstrati is oviparous, or egg-laying, with females laying four eggs in each clutch. It is a montane species and is found on slopes, in caves, and beneath stones in mountain streams. It is also found in agricultural land and both natural and plantation forests in the foothills.

The snake is known to predate upon the brown anole, Anoles sagrei, as well as upon Diploderma swinhonis.

Range and distribution
L. ruhstrati occurs in the Tranninh Plateau of Laos, in northern Vietnam, and a number of locations in southern China. It has been found in Hong Kong and Taiwan, as well as the Chinese provinces of Anhui, Fujian, Gansu, Guangdong, Guanxi, Guizhou, Jiangxi, Shaanxi, Sichuan, and Zhejiang. The subspecies Lycodon ruhstrati multifasciatus  has also been found in Japan's Ryukyu islands; however, this subspecies was subsequently reclassified as a separate species.

L. ruhstrati is classified as a species of Least Concern by the International Union for Conservation of Nature, because it is presumed to have a large population and to be distributed over a large area. It is also not thought to be declining very fast. No steps are currently being taken to specifically conserve this species, although it is thought to be found in a number of protected areas.

References

Further reading
Fischer JG (1886). "Herpetologische Notizen ". Abhandlungen aus dem Gebiete der Naturwissenschaften, Hamburg 9: 1-19 + Plates I-II. (Ophites ruhstrati, new species, pp. 16–18 + Plate II, figures 6a, 6b, 6d). (in German).

External links
Images at Snakes of Taiwan

ruhstrati
Snakes of Asia
Snakes of Southeast Asia
Snakes of China
Reptiles of Hong Kong
Reptiles of Laos
Reptiles of Taiwan
Snakes of Vietnam
Reptiles described in 1886
Taxa named by Johann Gustav Fischer